The Love Bug is a 1925 short silent comedy film directed by Robert F. McGowan. It was the 37th Our Gang short subject released.

Plot
Farina, Joe and Mickey are all struck by the love bug. After several problems, they go to the beauty salon, where Pineapple works and proceed to make shambles of it. The police arrive and arrest them, but Grandma (Florence Lee) comes to their rescue.

Cast

The Gang
 Joe Cobb – Joe
 Jackie Condon – Jackie
 Mickey Daniels – Mickey
 Allen Hoskins – Farina
 Eugene Jackson – Pineapple
 Mary Kornman – Mary
 Sonny Loy – Sing Joy

Additional cast
 Johnny Downs – tough kid
 Peggy Ahern – Peggy
 Ivadell Carter – girl getting picked on
 Dorothy Morrison – Farina's girlfriend
 Florence Lee – Grandma
 Joseph Morrison – father of Farina's girlfriend
 William Gillespie – beauty parlor manager

References

External links

1925 films
American silent short films
American black-and-white films
Films directed by Robert F. McGowan
Hal Roach Studios short films
1925 comedy films
Our Gang films
Silent American comedy films
1925 short films
1920s American films
1920s English-language films